Samuel Pepys Cockerill (18 June 1794 – 7 February 1869) was an English amateur cricketer who played first-class cricket from 1817 to 1819.

Cockerill attended Winchester College and subsequently played for the Old Wykehamists in a match in 1817, one of his 2 known appearances in first-class matches.  He played for the Gentlemen in the 1819 Gentlemen v Players match.

References

1794 births
1869 deaths
English cricketers
English cricketers of 1787 to 1825
Gentlemen cricketers
Old Wykehamists cricketers